"Little Jeannie" (spelled "Little Jeanie" on the cover of certain single releases) is a song written by English musician Elton John and Gary Osborne recorded by John, and released as a single in 1980 from John's album 21 at 33. It reached number three on the Billboard pop chart in the United States, becoming the singer's biggest U.S. hit since 1976's "Don't Go Breaking My Heart" (a duet with singer Kiki Dee), and his highest-charting solo hit since 1975's "Island Girl".

It became John's fifth No. 1 on the U.S. Adult contemporary chart, and was certified Gold by the RIAA. It peaked at No. 3 in both Billboard and Cash Box. In Canada, it hit number one on the RPM 100 national singles chart.

In the US, it would be John's highest-charting single co-written with Gary Osborne, while in the UK, where the song only reached number 33, "Blue Eyes" would eventually hold that honour.

Despite its impressive performance in the US charts, Elton John has rarely performed "Little Jeannie" live, doing so only on his 1980 tour and during 2000's One Night Only concerts.

Composition
Composed in the key of B flat, which allowed its notable saxophone solo to ring out, the song can be described as an uptempo ballad similar in feel, with its electric piano, to his earlier 1973 hit, "Daniel".

Critical reception
Billboard's reviewer noted that "this melodic midtempo ballad recalls the consummate commercial craftsmanship which characterized John's output around the time of Caribou in 1974" and "some brassy horn fills constitute the only real update on John's traditional sound." Cash Box said that "the Latin-flavored percussives and brass add a new exciting dimension to the mid-tempo beat." Record World said that it shows the "stylistic genius that brought us 'Your Song' and other pop ballad hits."

Personnel
 Bill Champlin – backing vocals
 Chuck Findley – trumpet, trombone
 Max Gronenthal – backing vocals
 Jerry Hey – flugelhorn
 Jim Horn – brass arrangement, piccolo flute, alto saxophone
 James Newton Howard – Fender Rhodes, Yamaha CS-80
 Elton John – lead vocals, backing vocals
 Reggie McBride – bass guitar
 Dee Murray – backing vocals
 Nigel Olsson – drums
 Richie Zito – acoustic guitar

Charts

Weekly charts

Year end charts

Certifications

See also
List of number-one adult contemporary singles of 1980 (U.S.)

References

1980 singles
Elton John songs
RPM Top Singles number-one singles
Songs with music by Elton John
Songs with lyrics by Gary Osborne
1980 songs
The Rocket Record Company singles